Liza Sheera Comita (born 1977) is an American ecologist and Professor of Tropical Forest Ecology in the School of the Environment at Yale University. Her research considers the plant community.

Early life and education 
Comita was born in Philadelphia, Pennsylvania. She was an undergraduate student at the University of Pennsylvania, where she majored in biology. Comita started a Master's program in conservational biology. She moved to the University of Georgia for doctoral research. Her research considered the abundance of woody plants and their survival in the seedling bank. The tropical forests studied by Comita contain some of the most diverse plant communities on earth. She combined community-wide surveying of seedlings on Barro Colorado Island with pre-existing tree data to better understand species abundance and distribution. In 2006, she joined the University of Minnesota as a postdoctoral researcher, where she worked for one year before moving to Columbia University. She moved to the National Center for Ecological Analysis and Synthesis in 2009.

Research and career 
In 2011, Comita joined Ohio State University as an Assistant Professor in the Department of Evolution, Ecology and Organismal Biology. She was appointed Assistant Professor of Tropical Forest Ecology at Yale University in 2014, and promoted to Professor in 2021. Her research considers plant community ecology and the mechanisms that drive patterns of diversity. She showed that rare plant species are sensitive to neighbors of their species, as opposed to the seedlings of common plants. As humans divide tropical forests into progressively smaller fragments, they increase the proportion of forest that suffer from so-called edge effects. Comita showed that these areas suffer from a number of environmental changes, including higher temperatures and lower humidity, which ultimately result in a loss of diversifying interactions.

Comita was appointed Director of the Yale University Center for Natural Carbon Capture in 2021.

Academic service 
Comita worked as a postdoctoral mentor to the early career researchers who took part in the Women in Science at Yale program. In 2021, she was part of the group of women researchers who called out the culture of sexual harassment at the Smithsonian Tropical Research Institute.

Awards and honors 
 2001 National Science Foundation Graduate Research Fellowship
 2015 Elected Early Career Fellow of the Ecological Society of America
 2016 Yale University Postdoctoral Mentoring Prize
 2017 British Ecological Society Founders’ Prize

Selected publications

References

External links
 

Living people
People from Philadelphia
Yale University faculty
University of Pennsylvania alumni
University of Georgia alumni
American ecologists
Women ecologists
1977 births